Rowzeh Chay Rural District is in the Central District of Urmia County, West Azerbaijan province, Iran. At the National Census of 2006, its population was 36,556 in 8,178 households. There were 47,510 inhabitants in 12,522 households at the following census of 2011. At the most recent census of 2016, the population of the rural district was 41,843 in 11,073 households. The largest of its 34 villages was Balu, with 14,058 people.

References 

Urmia County

Rural Districts of West Azerbaijan Province

Populated places in West Azerbaijan Province

Populated places in Urmia County